Fiona Batliner (born 22 December 2003) is a Liechtensteiner footballer who plays as a midfielder for the Swiss club St. Gallen-Staad and the Liechtenstein national football team.

Career 
In 2022, Batliner was awarded the first Liechtenstein Women's Footballer of the Year award

Career statistics

International

International goals

Honours

Individual 

 Liechtensteiner Footballer of the Year: 2022

External links
 Profile at FC St. Gallen's website

References

2003 births
Living people
Women's association football midfielders
Liechtenstein women's footballers
Liechtenstein women's international footballers